David or Dave Power may refer to:

 David Power (tennis) (born 1944), American tennis player
 David Power (Gaelic football manager) (born 1983)
 Dave Power (runner) (1928–2014), Australian long-distance runner
 Dave Power (soccer) (born 1954), English-born, American soccer player
 Dave Power, actor in U-571

See also
 David Davin-Power, Irish journalist